The Fishing Range is a subrange of the Swannell Ranges of the Omineca Mountains, located on the east side of Fishing Lakes and on the upper Finlay River in northern British Columbia, Canada.

References

Fishing Range in the Canadian Mountain Encyclopedia

Swannell Ranges